The Main Event was a co-headlining concert tour from American boy band New Kids on the Block with special guests TLC, and Nelly. The tour began on May 1, 2015, in Las Vegas, and finished on July 2, 2015, in Buffalo, New York. It included close to fifty dates across North America. It was the thirty-eighth ranked North American tour of 2015, grossing $26.1 million.

Background
In January 2015, New Kids on the Block appeared on Good Morning America to announce the tour. It had been hinted that the band might collaborate with TLC and Nelly while on the road. For the show's production there would be "new and top notch production elements", and a 360 degree stage. TLC was excited about the tour and said, "We are thrilled to be able to join pop icons NKOTB and Nelly on tour. We are equally excited to back on the road connecting with our fans in such huge arenas."

Concert synopsis
The concert began with Nelly performing a few of his songs, followed by TLC's set, which was approximately 40 minutes long. Then there was a ten-minute break before New Kids on the Block took the stage. Going with the theme of the tour, the band dramatically entered the stage looking "like prizefighters entering a ring," "wearing modern leather ensembles" and opening their set with a new song. "1989" would appear in a wedding-invitation style font on the screen whenever a classic New Kids song was performed. Fans could see the band during the costume changes that were captured on the "Quick Change Cam."

The show was filled with production and choreography for every song, including streamer cannons, confetti shooting high into the air, and heart-shaped balloons. The band started the show with two new songs. Other songs performed were "Block Party", "10", "Crash", "Step by Step" and "My Favorite Girl". There were solo sections during the show, such as Jordan Knight on his solo hit "Give It to You", Joey McIntyre on "Twisted", and Donnie Wahlberg on "I Need You".

Setlists

Tour dates

Critical reception 
Kelli Skye of the Orange County Register said that the show "was a grand spectacle done in the round so guests could get a 360-degree view of all of the on state action... [they] made sure that every section of the venue got a little love." Beth Spotswood from SF Gate stated that the New Kids "appeared older, more embarrassing in concert." Spotswood was ready to go home once McIntyre went out on stage wearing nothing but white jeans. On opening act Nelly, she said, "it was a bit sad to see the rapper hit the stage to perform for a bunch of moms at 7:20 p.m. on a Sunday evening." McIntyre would occasionally thank "the audience for sticking by NKOTB."

References 

New Kids on the Block concert tours
TLC (group) concert tours
Co-headlining concert tours
2015 concert tours